Bikini Atoll Airport, also known as Enyu Airfield, is a public use airstrip at Enyu on Bikini Atoll, Marshall Islands. This airstrip is assigned the location identifier BII by the IATA. The airstrip enables access to diving and shipwrecks.

Facilities
Bikini Atoll Airport has one runway measuring 4,460 x 140 ft (1,359 x 42.5 m).

Airlines and destinations

References

Airports in the Marshall Islands